John Law McNeil was a Scottish football player (a centre-half), and manager.

McNeil signed for Portsmouth from Musselburgh Bruntonians In December 1928. He moved to Reading in January 1930 where he was a regular for a while. After a spell with non-league Guildford City he moved to Inverness Caledonian from where he joined Plymouth Argyle in August 1934. He played 143 times, scoring 13 goals for Plymouth, leaving Home Park in the summer of 1939 when he joined Clapton Orient.

He later managed Merthyr Tydfil until June 1947, when he was appointed as manager of Torquay United. His first season was not a great success, Torquay finishing in 18th place, but the following two seasons saw finishes in 9th and 5th and the discovery of future club greats Don Mills and Sammy Collins. He resigned in March 1950 to take the manager's job at Second Division Bury, not before complaining about the low attendances at Plainmoor, even when the team was doing relatively well. His time at Gigg Lane saw Bury constantly battle against relegation – albeit to his credit this was achieved – until he left in November 1953.

Year of birth missing
Year of death missing
Scottish footballers
Scottish football managers
English Football League managers
Scottish Junior Football Association players
English Football League players
Highland Football League players
Musselburgh Athletic F.C. players
Portsmouth F.C. players
Reading F.C. players
Guildford City F.C. players
Plymouth Argyle F.C. players
Leyton Orient F.C. players
Torquay United F.C. managers
Bury F.C. managers
People from Inverkeithing
Caledonian F.C. players
Footballers from Fife
Merthyr Tydfil F.C. managers
Association football defenders